The Kazakh men's national under 20 ice hockey team is the national under-20 ice hockey team in Kazakhstan. The team represents Kazakhstan at the International Ice Hockey Federation's World Junior Hockey Championship Division I. They have played in the championship level 8 times (1998, 1999, 2000, 2001, 2008, 2009, 2019 and 2020)

History
Kazakhstan was promoted out of Pool B into Pool A for 1998. In Helsinki, Finland, the Kazakhs defeated Slovakia 5–2 to earn a spot in the quarter-finals. However, a devastating 14–1 loss to eventual gold-medalists Finland sent Kazakhstan to the placement games, where they defeated Canada 6–3 to finish 7th. It still stands as Kazakhstan's biggest win at the U20 level.

Nikolai Antropov became the 7th Kazakh player drafted into the National Hockey League when selected in the first round by the Toronto Maple Leafs in 1998. Antropov would captain the Kazakhstan team at the 1999 World Junior Ice Hockey Championships in Winnipeg, Canada. Kazakhstan tied Belarus 2–2 and defeated Switzerland 3–0 to finish third place in Group B and went on to play Canada in the quarter-finals. Canada won 12–2. Nikolai Zarzhitskiy scored both Kazakhstan goals and got player-of-the-game award. Kazakhstan finished 8th and avoided relegation.

Kazakhstan was without Antropov when he decided to stay with the Maple Leafs for the 1999–2000 NHL season. Kazakhstan was demolished 14–1 by Russia on 25 December 1999. Kazakhstan's only win was a 5–2 win over Ukraine to qualify for the quarter-finals. Kazakhstan lost to the Czech Republic 6–3.

Kazakhstan's four-year stay at the World Junior Hockey Championships ended in 2001 when the Kazakhs went winless and lost their fight to avoid relegation to Belarus.

Kazakhstan spent six years in Division I and nearly came close to being promoted back to the top level. In 2007, Kazakhstan was finally promoted by edging Norway 3–2 in an IIHF U20 Division I tournament in Torre Pellice, Italy.

Kazakhstan played in the 2008 World Junior Hockey Championships in Liberec, Czech Republic. The Kazakhs wore only their white nike swift jerseys during the tournament because blue jerseys were not available. Kazakhstan was up 2–0 against Russia, but lost 5–4. They also lost to the United States by a score of 4–2. Kazakhstan went on to defeat Switzerland 3–1 and defeated Denmark 6–3 to finish 8th.

Yakov Vorobyov became only the third Kazakh player to play in the Canadian Hockey League. Vorobyov played for the Ottawa 67's, but was released shortly after. Vadim Sozinov played for the Ottawa 67's in 2000–01 and Konstantin Pushkaryov played for the Calgary Hitmen in 2004–05.

Kazakhstan boosted plenty of returning players from 2008 upon coming to Ottawa, Canada, to compete in the 2009 World Junior Ice Hockey Championships. Kazakhstan scored only 4 goals during the entire tournament and was relegated back to Division I after a 7–1 loss to Latvia.

Oleg Bolyakin will remain as head coach for Kazakhstan as the Kazakhs will play in the 2010 World Junior Championships, Division 1, held in Gdańsk, Poland, from 14 to 20 December 2009. Kazakhstan will compete against Belarus, Italy, Norway, Croatia and Poland.

In 2018, after nine years in the Group I of Divisions A, Kazakhstan finished in first place. This victory allowed to take a place in the Top Division for 2019, held in Vancouver and Victoria in British Columbia, Canada.

On January 2, 2019, Kazakhstan defeated Denmark 4–3 in the relegation series, winning their first game in the top division in over a decade. They then defeated Denmark again, 4–0, which allowed them to compete in the top division for the 2020 tournament.

In the 2020 tournament, Kazakhstan failed to win any of their games in the preliminary round, and were relegated to Division IA for the 2021 tournament after losing the relegation series 2–1 to Germany.

Results

Junior national ice hockey teams
Junior